Sello Muso (born 3 March 1986) is a Mosotho footballer who currently plays as a midfielder for Likhopo Maseru. Since 2006, he has won 22 caps and scored four goals for the Lesotho national football team.

External links

Association football midfielders
Lesotho footballers
Lesotho expatriate footballers
Lesotho international footballers
Lesotho expatriate sportspeople in South Africa
Expatriate soccer players in South Africa
Free State Stars F.C. players
1986 births
Living people